The 1896 United States House of Representatives elections in South Carolina were held on November 3, 1896 to select seven Representatives for two-year terms from the state of South Carolina.  Five Democratic incumbents were re-elected, one Republican incumbent was defeated, and the open seat was retained by the Democrats.  The composition of the state delegation after the election was solely Democratic.

1st congressional district
Incumbent Republican Congressman George W. Murray of the 1st congressional district, in office since 1896, was defeated by Democratic challenger William Elliott.

General election results

|-
| bgcolor="#FF3333" |
| Reorganized Republican
| George W. Murray (incumbent)
| align="right" | 2,478
| align="right" | 33.9
| align="right" | N/A
|-

|-
| 
| colspan=5 |Democratic gain from Republican
|-

2nd congressional district
Incumbent Democratic Congressman W. Jasper Talbert of the 2nd congressional district, in office since 1893, defeated Republican challenger B.P. Chatfield.

General election results

|-
| 
| colspan=5 |Democratic hold
|-

3rd congressional district
Incumbent Democratic Congressman Asbury Latimer of the 3rd congressional district, in office since 1893, won the Democratic primary and defeated two Republican candidates in the general election.

Democratic primary

General election results

|-
| bgcolor="#FF3333" |
| Reorganized Republican
| Clarence Gray
| align="right" | 192
| align="right" | 1.8
| align="right" | N/A
|-

|-
| 
| colspan=5 |Democratic hold
|-

4th congressional district
Incumbent Democratic Congressman Stanyarne Wilson of the 4th congressional district, in office since 1895, won the Democratic primary and defeated two Republican candidates in the general election.

Democratic primary

General election results

|-
| bgcolor="#FF3333" |
| Reorganized Republican
| D.T. Bounds
| align="right" | 443
| align="right" | 3.6
| align="right" | N/A
|-

|-
| 
| colspan=5 |Democratic hold
|-

5th congressional district
Incumbent Democratic Congressman Thomas J. Strait of the 5th congressional district, in office since 1893, won the Democratic primary and defeated Republican John F. Jones in the general election.

Democratic primary

General election results

|-
| 
| colspan=5 |Democratic hold
|-

6th congressional district
Incumbent Democratic Congressman John L. McLaurin of the 6th congressional district, in office since 1893, defeated two Republican candidates in the general election.

General election results

|-
| bgcolor="#FF3333" |
| Reorganized Republican
| George Henry McKie
| align="right" | 482
| align="right" | 4.3
| align="right" | N/A
|-

|-
| 
| colspan=5 |Democratic hold
|-

7th congressional district special election
The seat for the 7th congressional district was declared vacant by the Republican controlled Congress in 1896.  A special election was called to be held simultaneously with the regular election and J. William Stokes defeated two Republican candidates in the election.

General election results

|-
| bgcolor="#FF3333" |
| Independent Republican
| D.A. Perrin
| align="right" | 26
| align="right" | 0.3
| align="right" | N/A
|-

|-
| 
| colspan=5 |Democratic hold
|-

7th congressional district
J. William Stokes, the winner of the previous election for the 7th congressional district, defeated Altamount Moses in the Democratic primary and two Republican candidates in the general election.

Democratic primary

General election results

|-
| bgcolor="#FF3333" |
| Independent Republican
| D.A. Perrin
| align="right" | 22
| align="right" | 0.2
| align="right" | -0.1
|-

|-
| 
| colspan=5 |Democratic hold
|-

See also
United States House of Representatives elections, 1896
South Carolina gubernatorial election, 1896
South Carolina's congressional districts

References

"Report of the Secretary of State to the General Assembly of South Carolina.  Election Returns." Reports and Resolutions of the General Assembly of the State of South Carolina at the Regular Session Commencing January 12, 1897. Volume I. Columbia, SC: 1897, pp. 4–7.

United States House of Representatives
1896
South Carolina